George Hamilton Rae (born 23 November 1978, Ayrshire, Scotland) is a Scottish professional actor best known for his portrayal of Otto Kringelein in the 2015 London revival of the musical Grand Hotel.

Early life 
Rae was born in Irvine, North Ayrshire, Scotland and attended Ayr Academy.  He continued his education at Iain Tomlin School of Music at Edinburgh Napier University, where he graduated with a Bachelor of Music Degree, followed by the Royal Academy of Music, London, where he graduated with a Postgraduate Diploma (Distinction) in Musical Theatre and the Licentiate of the Royal Academy of Music as a Singing Teacher.

Career 
Rae made his West End debut in 2003 starring in Joseph and the Amazing Technicolour Dreamcoat at London's New London Theatre alongside Stephen Gately from the Irish boyband Boyzone.

Following Joseph, Rae performed in several productions at Scotland’s Pitlochry Festival Theatre where he was awarded the prestigious Leon Sinden Award in 2010 for his portrayal as Tim in Noises Off. He also created the role of George Campbell in the theatre’s first musical production, Whisky Galore a Musical! (2009).

In 2013 Rae embarked on the UK & Ireland tour of The Lion King in the role of Timon, including the Irish premiere of the show. Following this, he performed the role of Otto Kringelein in the 2015 London revival of Grand Hotel for which he was nominated for three Best Actor awards, including an Off West End Theatre Award or 'Offie' nomination, and was subsequently featured in theatre critic Mark Shenton’s 2017 list of the ten best men in UK musical theatre.

In 2018 Rae made his solo cabaret debut at New York City’s 54 Below.

Theatre 
 I Love You, You're Perfect, Now Change, Chiswick Playhouse (formerly Tabard Theatre), London (2019) ...Various
 Annie, UK & Ireland Tour (2019) ...Bert Healy
 Life is a Caba-RAE: A Scot in New York!, Feinstein's/54 Below, New York City (2018)
 Singin' in the Rain, Pitlochry Festival Theatre (2017) ...Cosmo Brown
 The Frogs, Jermyn Street Theatre, London (2017) ...Xanthias
 Spamalot, The English Theatre Frankfurt (2016) ...Patsy
 Adding Machine, Finborough Theatre, London (2016) ...Mr Two/Shrdlu
 Grand Hotel, Southwark Playhouse, London (2015) ...Otto Kringelein
 Sister Act, Aberystwyth Arts Centre (2014) ...TJ
 The Lion King, UK & Ireland Tour (2013) ...Timon/Zazu
 Company, King's Head Theatre, London (2012) ...David
 Whisky Galore a Musical!, Pitlochry Festival Theatre (2011) ...George Campbell
 Rough Crossing, Pitlochry Festival Theatre (2010) ...Dvornichek
 Kiss Me, Kate, Pitlochry Festival Theatre (2010) ...Ralph/Gremio
 Noises Off, Pitlochry Festival Theatre (2010) ...Tim
 The Life of Stuff, Pitlochry Festival Theatre (2009) ...Fraser
 The Mikado, USA & UK Tour, Carl Rosa Opera Company (2008) ...u/s Ko-Ko
 I Love You, You're Perfect, Now Change, UK & Ireland Tour (2007) ...Man 1
 Fame, UK Tour (2004) ...Schlomo
 Joseph and the Amazing Technicolor Dreamcoat, New London Theatre, London (2005,2003) ...Benjamin

Television 
 Still Game, BBC Scotland (2019) ...Alan
 Some Enchanted Evening, BBC 3 (2002) ...Herbie
 Taggart, Scottish Television (2001) ...Pirate

References

External links 
 Official site
 Spotlight
 Global Artists

Living people
Scottish male stage actors
1978 births
People from Irvine, North Ayrshire
Alumni of the Royal Academy of Music
People educated at Ayr Academy
Alumni of Edinburgh Napier University